Edward Wade was a politician.

Edward Wade (or variants) may also refer to:

Ed Wade (born 1956), baseball executive
Eddie Wade (born 1948), Irish politician
Ned Wade (hurler) (1911–1992), Irish hurler
Ted Wade (Australian footballer) (1884–1966), Australian rules footballer
Ted Wade (footballer, born 1901) (1901–?), English football player

See also
Ted Wade (disambiguation)